Steve Gainey (born January 26, 1979) is a Canadian former professional ice hockey forward who played in parts of four seasons in the National Hockey League (NHL) for the Dallas Stars and Phoenix Coyotes. He is the son of former NHL player and executive Bob Gainey.

Playing career
Gainey was drafted in the 3rd round, 77th overall by the Dallas Stars in the 1997 NHL Entry Draft, by his father, General Manager Bob Gainey. Gainey attended St. Andrew's College for the 1994–1995 academic year prior to playing for the WHL's Kamloops Blazers.

On February 16, 2004, he was traded from the Stars, to the Philadelphia Flyers in exchange for Mike Siklenka. However Gainey only spent time with their AHL affiliate the Philadelphia Phantoms. On November 4, 2005, he signed a contract to play for the Phoenix Coyotes.

In September 2006, he was invited to the Vancouver Canucks training camp but was later cut from the camp.  After two seasons in retirement, Gainey made a return to the professional ranks in signing a contract with the Idaho Steelheads of the ECHL on October 14, 2008. In the following 2008–09 season, Gainey was signed to a professional try-out contract with the Montreal Canadiens affiliate, the Hamilton Bulldogs, scoring 7 goals in 33 games before formally ending his professional career.

Career statistics

Regular season and playoffs

See also
List of family relations in the NHL

References

External links

1979 births
Living people
Anglophone Quebec people
Canadian ice hockey left wingers
Dallas Stars draft picks
Dallas Stars players
Dauphins d'Épinal players
Fort Wayne Komets players
Hamilton Bulldogs (AHL) players
Ice hockey people from Montreal
Idaho Steelheads (ECHL) players
Kamloops Blazers players
Kalamazoo Wings (1974–2000) players
Philadelphia Phantoms players
Phoenix Coyotes players
San Antonio Rampage players
Utah Grizzlies (AHL) players
Canadian expatriate ice hockey players in France